Songs of Inspiration is the twentieth studio album and the first gospel album by American country music group Alabama, released on October 24, 2006. The album debuted at No. 1 on both the Top Country Albums and Top Christian Albums charts, with 41,000 copies sold the first week.  The album has sold 170,000 copies as of September 2015. It ranked at No. 15 on Billboard 200 album charts and No. 1 on Billboard Country Albums chart.

Track listing
"His Eye Is on the Sparrow" (Civilla D. Martin, Charles H. Gabriel) - 4:10
"In the Garden" (C. Austin Miles) - 3:28
"Amazing Grace" (John Newton) - 3:35
"How Great Thou Art" (Stuart K. Hine) - 4:26
"I Need Thee" (Annie S. Hawks, Robert Lowry) - 2:09
"Old Shep" (Red Foley) - 3:06
"Jesus Loves Me" (William Batchelder Bradbury, David Rutherford McGuire, Anna Bartlett Warner) - 3:19
"Silent Night" (Franz Gruber, Josef Mohr) - 3:31
"I Am the Man Thomas" (Larry Sparks, Ralph Stanley) - 2:02
"Rock of Ages" (Augustus Montague Toplady, Thomas Hastings) - 2:36
"In the Sweet By and By" (Sanford F. Bennett, Joseph Philbrick Webster) - 3:28
"The Old Rugged Cross" (George Bennard) - 3:09
"What Will I Leave Behind" (Sherrill Brown) - 2:40
"One Big Heaven" (Randy Owen) - 4:16
"Rain" (Owen) - 3:35

Personnel 

Alabama
 Jeff Cook – electric guitar, vocals
 Randy Owen – acoustic guitar, electric guitar, vocals
 Teddy Gentry – bass guitar, vocals

Additional Musicians

 Gary Prim – acoustic piano, synthesizers, Hammond B3 organ
 Joey Miskulin – accordion
 Mark Casstevens – acoustic guitar, banjo, dobro, harmonica
 Randy Kohrs – acoustic guitar, dobro
 James Alan Shelton – acoustic guitar
 Larry Paxton – electric guitar, nylon string guitar, acoustic bass, bass guitar, string arrangements 
 Steve Sparkman – banjo
 Nathan Stanley – mandolin
 Eddie Bayers – drums, percussion
 Dewey Brown III – fiddle
 Aubrey Haynie – fiddle, mandolin
 Kristin Wilkinson – string arrangements 
 Carl Gorodetzky – string contractor
 Kirsten Cassi – cello
 Anthony LaMarchina – cello
 Bruce Christensen – viola
 Christopher Farrell – viola
 Gary Vanosdale – viola
 David Davidson – violin
 Conni Ellisor – violin
 Carolyn Huebel – violin
 Pamela Sixfin – violin
 Alan Umstead – violin
 Mary Kathryn Vanosdale – violin
 Bailey Barnes – backing vocals
 Karstin Brewis – backing vocals
 Kensley Brewis – backing vocals
 David Burt – backing vocals 
 Sawyer Burt – backing vocals
 Michael Curtis – backing vocals
 Melinda Doolittle – backing vocals
 Kim Fleming – backing vocals
 Ella Fowler – backing vocals
 Abby Fraebel – backing vocals
 Griffin Horton – backing vocals
 Kaden Horton – backing vocals 
 Rebecca Isaacs Bowman –backing vocals (5)
 Ben Isaacs – backing vocals (5)
 Nathan Isaacs – backing vocals (5)
 Alexis Lutz – backing vocals
 Emma Lutz – backing vocals
 Jesse Lutz – backing vocals
 Belinda Wallace – backing vocals 
 Nathan Young – backing vocals
 Ralph Stanley – vocals (9)

Chart performance

Awards 

In 2007, the album was nominated for a Dove Award for Country Album of the Year at the 38th GMA Dove Awards.

References

2006 albums
Alabama (American band) albums
RCA Records albums